Dalmor Bank is a submarine bank with a least depth of about , lying off the east end of Dufayel Island in Ezcurra Inlet, King George Island. It was named by the Polish Antarctic Expedition after the expedition ship Dalmor, which first used the bank in 1977 as the best anchorage in the inlet.

References
 

Undersea banks of the Southern Ocean
Poland and the Antarctic